Love Story is a 1981 Indian Hindi-language romantic film directed by Rahul Rawail. The film stars Rajendra Kumar alongside his son Kumar Gaurav and Vijeta Pandit, both making their film debuts. Vidya Sinha, Danny Denzongpa, Amjad Khan and Aruna Irani appear in supporting roles.

Box Office India called it an "All Time Blockbuster".

Plot
Vijay Mehra is a wealthy builder and loves Suman, who also loves Vijay. Ram Dogra is a civil engineer who loves Suman. Ram and Suman were friends in college.

But Vijay leaves Suman because he feels jealous of Ram and Suman's friendship and marries another girl, and Suman marries Ram, but Vijay's wife dies after giving birth to a baby boy, Bunty, while Suman and Ram welcome a baby girl, Pinky.

Years later, Bunty and Pinky meet as strangers, Vijay wants Bunty to become a builder with him, but Bunty wants to become a pilot, due to this reason, Bunty leaves home, and Pinky also leaves the home because her father wants her to marry.

Bunty and Pinky meet again, but Hawaldar Sher Singh, who is assigned the job of finding the missing boy and girl, handcuffs them together, after some the good and bad circumstances, both fall in love with each other, they go somewhere unknown place and build a small cottage and live happily.

But, not ever after. Bobby enters the scene and forcibly takes away Pinky. Now, Vijay is ready to accept his son's love, but Ram plans to get his daughter married against her wishes.

Bunty and Pinky run away from home again, but a gang of robbers follow them, suddenly, Vijay and Ram come to save their children and Bunty saves Ram's life. Ram changes his mind, and in the end Bunty and Pinky marry.

Cast
 Rajendra Kumar as Vijay Mehra
 Kumar Gaurav as Bunty Mehra
 Vijayta Pandit as Pinky Dogra
 Vidya Sinha as Suman Dogra
 Danny Denzongpa as Ram Dogra
 Amjad Khan as Constable Sher Singh
 Aruna Irani as Dancer
 Beena Banerjee as Vijay's Wife
 Bharat Kapoor as Basheera

Soundtrack
All the songs became mega-hits at that time. Except one, all songs have sung by Amit Kumar, along with Lata Mangeshkar and Asha Bhosle giving female voice. The music was composed by R. D. Burman, with lyrics by Anand Bakshi.

Awards

 29th Filmfare Awards:

Won

 Best Male Playback Singer – Amit Kumar for "Teri Yaad Aa Rahi Hai"

Nominated

 Best Supporting Actor – Amjad Khan
 Best Music Director – R. D. Burman
 Best Lyricist – Anand Bakshi for "Teri Yaad Aa Rahi Hai"

References

External links 
 
 Cult of Kumar

1981 films
1980s Hindi-language films
1980s teen romance films
1980s romantic musical films
Indian romantic musical films
Films scored by R. D. Burman
Indian teen romance films
Films directed by Rahul Rawail
Hindi films remade in other languages
Indian pregnancy films
Films shot in Jammu and Kashmir
Films shot in Mumbai